Zygmunt Tarło (c. 1561 or 1562–1628) was a Polish–Lithuanian noble.

He was Chorąży of Przemyśl since 1606 and castellan of Nowy Sącz since 1613.

He was married to Barbara Drohojewska since 1601. They had three children together: Zygmunt Aleksander Tarło, Andrzej Tarło and Teofilia Tarło. He was buried in Żarki.

1560s births
1628 deaths
Zygmunt